Chah Khaseh (also Romanized as Chāh Khāşeh) is a village in Shandiz Rural District, Shandiz District, Torqabeh and Shandiz County, Razavi Khorasan Province, Iran. At the 2006 census, its population was 824, in 206 families.

References 

Populated places in Torqabeh and Shandiz County